
Year 264 (CCLXIV) was a leap year starting on Friday (link will display the full calendar) of the Julian calendar. At the time, it was known as the Year of the Consulship of Gallienus and Saturninus (or, less frequently, year 1017 Ab urbe condita). The denomination 264 for this year has been used since the early medieval period, when the Anno Domini calendar era became the prevalent method in Europe for naming years.

Events 
 By place 
 Asia 
 March 1–3 – Zhong Hui's Rebellion in China is quelled. 
 Sima Zhao, regent of the Chinese state of Cao Wei, styles himself the "King of Jin", the penultimate step before usurpation.
 Sun Hao succeeds Sun Xiu as emperor of the Chinese state of Eastern Wu.

Births

Deaths 
 March 3  
 Jiang Wei (or Boyue), Chinese general and regent (b. 202)
 Zhang Yi (or Bogong), Chinese general and politician 
 Zhong Hui (or Shiji), Chinese general and politician (b. 225)
 March 22 – Dionysius the Great, patriarch of Alexandria
 September 3 – Sun Xiu (Jing of Wu), Chinese emperor (b. 235)
 Deng Ai (or Shizai), Chinese general and politician (b. 197)
 Guo (or Mingyuan), Chinese empress of the Cao Wei state
 Liao Hua (or Yuanjian), Chinese general and politician
 Liu Xuan, Chinese prince of the Shu Han state (b. 224)
 Puyang Xing (or Ziyuan), Chinese official and chancellor
 Zong Yu (or Deyan), Chinese general and politician

References